Chach (c. 631-671 AD) was a Hindu Brahmin king of Sindh region of the Indian subcontinent in the mid-7th century AD. Chach expanded the kingdom of Sindh, and his successful efforts to subjugate surrounding monarchies and ethnic groups into an empire covering the entire Indus valley and beyond were recorded in the Chach Nama.

Biography
Chach was a  Brahmin who rose to a position of influence under Rai Sahiras II, king of Sindh and a member of the Rai dynasty. Chach was the chamberlain to the King. According to the Chachnama, the last Rai emperor, Rai Sahasi II, died through illness without issue. By that time, Chach was in complete control of the affairs of the kingdom and had developed illicit sexual relations with Sahasi's wife (queen Rani Suhanadi). When Rai Sahasi II was near death, Suhanadi explained to Chach that the kingdom would pass to other relatives of the dying king in the absence of any direct heir. Consequently, they hid the news of the king's death until claimants to the throne were killed through conspiracy. Following this, Chach declared himself a ruler and later married Suhandi. This ended the Rai Dynasty and began the dynasty of a Brahmin dynasty called Chach dynasty.
Maharana Maharat of Chittor, the brother of Rai Sahasi II invited Chach to a duel to seek revenge from Chach for killing his brother Rai Sahasi II and for usurping the throne of Sindh.
 He then launched a campaign against a succession of autonomous regions; he defeated his opponents along the south bank of the River Beas, at Iskandah, and at Sikkah. He sacked Sikkah, killing 5,000 men and taking the remainder of its inhabitants prisoners. A significant number of these captives were enslaved, and much booty was taken. After this victory, he appointed a thakur to govern from Multan, and used his army to settle boundary disputes with Kashmir. Chach also conquered Sehwan, but allowed its chief, Matta, to remain as his feudatory.

Later, he expanded his rule into Buddhist regions across the Indus River. These efforts culminated in a battle at Brahmanabad, in which the region's governor, Agham Lohana, was killed. Chach remained in Brahmanabad for a year to cement his authority there, and appointed Agham's son Sarhand as his governor; Sarhand was also wed to Chach's niece. Chach took Agham's widow as his wife, as well.

From Brahmanabad, he raided Sassanid territory through the town of Uthal, marching from Uthal to Bela. He failed to extract any tribute and was forced to retreat.

Upon his death, Chach was succeeded by his brother Chandar; Chandar is stated to have ruled for eight years, whereupon Dahir, Chach's eldest son, inherited the throne.

In 664 Caliph Usman sent an invading army to raid and annex Bharuch. This army however, shortly after setting off from its base in Balochistan was intercepted by Maharaja Chach during its march and a battle was fought. The commander of the Sindhi forces, Narayandev was killed by the Muslim army leading to a crushing defeat for Chach and the partial annexation of Sindh by the Rashidun Caliphate.

Places named after Chach 

Several places along the Sindhu River were named after Chach; among these are Chachpur, Chachar, Chachro, Chachgaon, Chachi.

Resistance against Khalifas 
Long before Mohmmed Bin Qasim, The Arabs started picking up quarrels with Brahmin Kings of Sindh. At length, Usman, the governor of the Grand Khalipha's distant province of Oman, openly attacked the Hindu state of Sindh. Then the Brahmin King of Sindh, Maharaja Chacha met the invaders outside Broach and defeated them with heavy slaughter also killing their very Commander-in-Chief Abdul Aziz in the process .

References

History of Sindh
Hindu monarchs
History of Rajasthan
7th-century monarchs in Asia
Chach Nama